Marie-Paule Gnabouyou (born 4 March 1988) is a French handball player for Toulon Saint-Cyr Var Handball and the French national team.

Marie-Paule Gnabouyou participated at the 2011 World Women's Handball Championship in Brazil. Her brother Guy Gnabouyou is a professional footballer.

References

External links

French female handball players
Sportspeople from Marseille
1988 births
Living people
Expatriate handball players
French expatriate sportspeople in Denmark
Viborg HK players